Group E of the 2021 Africa Cup of Nations took place from 11 to 20 January 2022. The group consisted of defending champions Algeria, Equatorial Guinea, the Ivory Coast and Sierra Leone.

The Ivory Coast and Equatorial Guinea advanced to the round of 16.

Teams

Notes

Standings

Matches

Algeria vs Sierra Leone

Equatorial Guinea vs Ivory Coast

Ivory Coast vs Sierra Leone

Algeria vs Equatorial Guinea

Ivory Coast vs Algeria

Sierra Leone vs Equatorial Guinea

References

External links
 

2021 Africa Cup of Nations